Norman Landon Foote (November 30, 1915 – May 12, 1974) was the tenth bishop of the Episcopal Diocese of Idaho from 1957 to 1972.

Early life and education
Foote was born on November 30, 1915, in Saratoga Springs, New York, the son of Leroy Herman Foote and Amy Verina Close. Foote was educated at the Saratoga public schools and graduated from Saratoga High School in 1933. He later enrolled at Hamilton College, where he studied for one year before transferring to Princeton University in 1934, from where he graduated with a B.A. in history in 1937. Later, Foote studied at the General Theological Seminary from where he graduated with a Bachelor of Sacred Theology in 1940. In 1957, he was awarded a Doctor of Sacred Theology from General Theological Seminary and a Doctor of Divinity from Church Divinity School of the Pacific.

Priest
Foote was ordained deacon in Albany, New York in May 1940. His first post was as deacon in the missionary district of Montana. He was ordained priest in December 1940 in Bozeman, Montana, after which he served as a missionary priest in Virginia City, Montana. He became Archdeacon of Montana in 1943. In 1950 he was appointed Director of the National Town-Country Church Institute

Bishop
Foote was elected missionary Bishop of Idaho in 1956. He was consecrated on February 14, 1957 in St Michael's Cathedral in Boise, Idaho by Presiding Bishop Henry Knox Sherrill. Foote became the first bishop of the newly created Diocese of Idaho in 1967. He retired on February 14, 1972 due to ill health and moved to McCall, Idaho. He died on May 12, 1974 from complications of emphysema while in hospital in Cascade, Idaho.

References 
Finding aid for Norman L. Foote Papers, 1937-1974

1915 births
1974 deaths
General Theological Seminary alumni
Episcopal bishops of Idaho
People from Saratoga Springs, New York
Princeton University alumni
20th-century American Episcopalians
20th-century American clergy